UMH may refer to:
 Miguel Hernández University of Elche, a Spanish university, located in the province of Alicante
 Underwood-Memorial Hospital, a hospital in Woodbury, New Jersey, USA
 The United Methodist Hymnal
 University of Mons-Hainaut, a university in the French Community of Belgium
 UMH group, an international multimedia group based in Ukraine